Adam May (born 6 July 1976) is a British sailor. He competed in the Tornado event at the 2000 Summer Olympics.

References

External links
 
 

1976 births
Living people
British male sailors (sport)
Olympic sailors of Great Britain
Sailors at the 2000 Summer Olympics – Tornado
Place of birth missing (living people)